Roswell Parsons Crafts (September 17, 1822 – September 3, 1904) was an American businessman, politician, fire chief, and the second and sixth mayor of Holyoke, Massachusetts. Born in Whately, Massachusetts on September 17, 1822 to Chester and Phila (née Jewett) Crafts, he arrived in Holyoke at age 11, and after attending school began his first business driving a stagecoach between Springfield and Northampton carrying mail and passengers. At the age of 20 he helped his brother, Chester, open a general store under the name Chester Crafts & Co. In 1843 he married Ms. Delia Jones of Ireland Parish; the couple bore one son, Pliny Jones Chester on February 9, 1845.

This same year he left his brother's venture to open his own store on High Street. By 1866 he had made his son a business partner, operating under the name R.P. Crafts & Son. In 1870 his store's building and its contents burned to the ground, prompting him to construct the Caledonia Building in 1874. Prior to this he had served as the city's fire chief from 1868 to 1869, and following his own store's fire served for one more year in 1871.

Ever present in the political landscape of the town, he ran successfully for a representative seat for the Massachusetts Legislature in 1872. When Holyoke was incorporated as a city in 1873, Crafts ran for mayor against William B. C. Pearsons that Fall; local historian George H. Allyn later recalled–

the recriminations of [1912] are weak and feeble compared with what passed between the advocates of W. B. C. Pearsons and R. P. Crafts. When Pearsons was elected by a majority of sixty-two the Transcript came out with a cut of the most exultant, arrogant, loud-throated rooster that it was ever our fortune to gaze upon. He was re-elected, and then R. P. Crafts was given a turn ...

Losing the first mayoral election, Crafts subsequently ran successfully in 1876 as well as 1881 and 1882 for 3 one-year terms. During his time as mayor, the city opened its first paved roads.

By the end of his life, Crafts had held several properties in the city, as well as a stake in the Bemis Paper Company. He died at his residence in Holyoke on September 3, 1904 from kidney failure, and was interred in Forestdale Cemetery.

See also
 1872 Massachusetts legislature

Notes

References
 
 
 

1822 births
1904 deaths
19th-century American politicians
Mayors of Holyoke, Massachusetts
Businesspeople from Massachusetts
Massachusetts Democrats
People from Franklin County, Massachusetts
Mayors of places in Massachusetts
19th-century American businesspeople